Michael David Cameron (born July 21, 1959) is an American minister and politician from Georgia. Cameron is a Republican member of Georgia House of Representatives for District 1.

Early life 
On July 21, 1959, Cameron was born in Chattanooga, Tennessee. Cameron and his family lived in Rossville, Georgia and Lookout Valley, Tennessee. In 1977, Cameron graduated from Lookout Valley High School.

Education 
In 1979, Cameron earned an Associate of Science degree in Business from Chattanooga State. In 1987, Cameron earned a Bachelor 
of Arts degree in History.

Career 
In 1982 Cameron began his career in the health insurance industry for Blue Cross Blue Shield of Tennessee, until his retirement in 2014.

Cameron is a Lay Minister at Good Shepherd Lutheran Church in East Ridge, Tennessee.

On November 3, 2020, Cameron won the election unopposed and became a Republican member of Georgia House of Representatives for District 1.

References

External links 
 Mike Cameron at ballotpedia.org
 Mike Cameron at ourcampaigns.com

1959 births
21st-century American politicians
Living people
Republican Party members of the Georgia House of Representatives
People from Chattanooga, Tennessee